Ay (short from of Ayar) was one of the Tamil dynasties which controlled the south-western tip of the peninsula, from the early historic period up to the medieval period.The clan traditionally held sway over the harbour of Vizhinjam, the fertile region of Nanjinad, and southern parts of the spice-producing Western Ghat mountains. The dynasty was also known as Kupaka in medieval period. 

The Ay formed one of the major chieftains of early historic (pre-Pallava) Kerala, along with the Cheras of central Kerala and the Musakas of Elimalai in the north. Greek geographer Claudius Ptolemy (2nd century AD) described the "Aioi" territory as extending from the Baris (Pamba) to Cape Comorin (Kanyakumari). The elephant was the emblem of the Ay.

The medieval Ay lineage has its origins in the hill-chiefs of early historic (pre-Pallava) south India. The Ay kingdom functioned as a buffer state between the powerful Pandyas/Cholas and the Cheras (Kerala) in the medieval period. A number of kings such as Chadayan Karunanthan (788 AD), Karunanthadakkkan "Srivallabha" (r. c. 856/57–884), and Vikramaditya "Varaguna" (r. c. 884–911/920 AD) figure as the Ay chiefs of the harbour of Vizhinjam. The famous Brahmin salai at Kantalur, somewhere near present-day Trivandrum, was located in the Ay kingdom. The salai was sacked by Chola emperor Rajaraja I (985–1014 AD) in c. 988 AD. Historians assume that the Ay were a leading power in the region till c. 10th century AD.

Origin 
It is speculated that the name Ay is derived from the early Tamil word "Ay" meaning cowherd. The cowherds were known as Ayars in Tamil even as they were known as Abhiras in the North India. Tradition says that the Yadavas in the Pandya country came to Tamilakam along with the ancestors of the Pandya. Potiya mountain region and its capital was known as Ay-kudi. Nacchinarkiniyar, in his commentary on the prefatory sutra to the Tolkappiyam, describes a tradition relating to the migration of the Yadava race with a sage Agastya, who repaired to Dwaraka and took with him the 18 kings of the line of Krsna and moved to the South. There, he had the forests cleared and built up kingdoms settling therein all the people he had brought with him.

In his introduction to Lilathilakam, Attur Krishna Pisharodi in giving an account of Chiravayi says that the Ayar family who were ruling the regions near Ayakkudi (in Shencotta) and other places, were defeated by the Pandyas in the 8th century A.D. and they migrated to Vizhinjam, a sea port eight miles south-east of Trivandrum.

The Ay kings continued to cherish their association with the Yadu-kula and Krsna in the later times also as seen in their copper plate grants and inscriptions.

The medieval Ay claimed that they belonged to the Yadava or Vrishni lineage and this claim was advanced by the rulers of Venad and Travancore. Sri Padmanabha in Trivandrum was the tutelary deity of the medieval Ay family.

History 

The Ay clan was one of the major hill-chiefs of early historic south India. Members of the Ay family –  of the Podiyil Hills (the Aykudi) –  were related to the early historic Cheras of central Kerala. Towards the close of the early historic period, Pandya supremacy might have extended to the Ay territory (through it is likely that the Ay gained their independence during the Kalabhra period).

Ay chieftains of early historic south India 
A number of Ay chiefs such as Andiran, Titiyan and Atiyan are mentioned in the early Tamil poems.

 Ay Andiran is praised by early Tamil poets such as Mudamochiyar, Odakizhar, and Kiranar in Purananuru. He is mentioned in the Purananuru as the "Lord of Podiyil Mala" in southern Western Ghats. He is said to have defeated the Kongu chiefs and pursued them to the Arabian Sea. He was an elder contemporary of the Chera chief Antuvan Cheral.
 Ay Titiyan (the Podiyil Chelvan) is praised by authors Paranar and Bhuta Pandya (the Pandya chief) in Akananuru.  It seems that Ay Titiyan was a vassal of the Pandya ruler Bhuta Pandya.
 Ay Atiyan, successor to Ay Titiyan, is mentioned by authors Paranar and Madurai Kanakkayanar in Akananuru. Paranar and Kanakkayanar also mention Podiyil Mala, the Ay base, as the property of Pachupun Pandya (Azhakiya Pandya), the successor to Bhuta Pandya.
 An Ay ruler took part in the famous battle of Talai-yalankanam, in which the Pandya chief Nedum Chezhiyan defeated several of his enemies.

Originally the whole region of Venad (Vel+natu = the country of the Vel people, related to the Ay family) was part of the larger Ay-Vel territory. Persons (the Vels) belonging to the Ay family were the chieftains of the Vel country.

 Veliyan Venmal Nallini was the wife of the Chera chieftain Utiyan.
 Veliyan Venman Ay Eyinan was the leader of the Chera warriors against Nannan of Ezhimalai.

Pandya foray into the Ay country 

In c. 765 AD, Pandya king Jatila Paranthaka/Nedum Chadayan Varaguna I (r. 765–815 AD) sacked port Vizhinjam by defeating the Vel chieftain (the Vel Mannan, who might have been related to the Ay family) and took possession of the Ay-Vel country ("the fertile country along with its magnificent treasures") (Madras Museum Plates of Jatila Parantaka, 17th year). This event is also remembered in the Velvikkudi plates (3rd regnal year, Nedum Chadayan) as "the suppression of the rebellious Ay-Vel".

The Pandya foray into south Kerala brought the Chera-Perumal rulers into the conflict and a prolonged Pandya-Ay/Chera struggle followed. 

 The Pandya king "Maran Chadayan" Jatila Paranthaka destroyed a fort at Aruviyoor (Aruvikkarai near Thalakulam) by defeating Chadayan Karunanthan of "Malai Nadu" in 788 AD (23rd year, Kalukumalai inscription). 
 In 792 AD (27th year, Jatila Paranthaka) the Chera warriors (the Cheramanar Padai) are seen fighting for a fort at Vizhinjam and at Karaikkotta (Karaikkodu near Thalakulam) against a commander of Maran Chadayan (Trivandrum Museum Inscription of Maran Chadayan).

Detachment of Venad 
In the 9th century, as a result of the encroachment of the Pandyas and Chera-Perumals, the ancient Ay territory was partitioned into two portions. Venad (the country of the Vel people) with its base at Kollam came under influence of the Chera-Perumal kingdom while the Ay kingdom, or what was left of it, with its base at Vizhinjam came under the influence of the Pandya ruler Srimara Srivallabha (r. 815–862). Larger Cinnamanur Plates do mention a victory of king Srivallabha at Vizhinjam. Ay vassal of the Pandya king Srimara Srivallabha was certain Karunanthadakkkan Srivallabha (r. c. 856/57–884). 

Srimara Srivallabha was succeeded on the Pandya throne by Varaguna II (r. 862–885 AD). The Ay kings of Vizhinjam remained vassals of the Pandyas, as indicated by the surname of the then king Vikramaditya (r. c. 884–911/920 AD). 

The Pandyas were defeated in the "great battle of Sripurambiyam" in c. 885 AD. Chera Perumal's considerable influence in the Ay country following this battle is visible in two records discovered from that region. A record of the Kizhan Adikal Ravi Neeli, the wife of Chera Perumal Vijayaraga, can be found in Tirunandikkara, a Shiva temple located in the Ay country. In 898 AD, Vikramaditya Varaguna is seen making huge land gifts to the Srimulavasa Buddhist vihara in the Chera Perumal kingdom (the Paliyam copper plates).

The chieftains of Venad, owing allegiance to the Chera-Perumals, were determined on extending their sway into the Ay kingdom. Their opportunity might have came in the disorder following the Chola defeat at Takkolam (mid-10 century AD). The Venad chieftains were eventually successful in capturing the whole Ay country down to Kottaru. In general, the influence of the Kerala rulers spread into the southern Ay territory in the 10th century AD.

Chola influence in Ay country 
The famous salai at Kantalur, somewhere near present-day Trivandrum, was located in the Ay country (865 AD, Huzur/Parthivapuram Plates, Karunanthadakkkan). The salai was sacked by Chola emperor Rajaraja I in c. 988 AD (fourth regnal year). 

The entire region to the south of Trivandrum, including the port of Vizhinjam and Cape Comorin, came under the control of king Rajaraja in the early 11th century. The kings of Kollam (i. e., Venad), Kodungallur (the Chera Perumal), and Kolladesam (Mushika) were also defeated by the Cholas (Senur inscription, 1005 AD). There is a possibility that the Venad chieftains tried to recapture the old Ay region after the raids by Rajaraja I. Chola Rajadhiraja claims to have "confined the undaunted king of Venadu [back] to the Chera kingdom [from the Ay country]......and liberated the [Ay] king of Kupaka...and put on a fresh garland of Vanchi after the capturing Kantalur Salai while the strong Villavan [the Chera king] hid himself in terror inside the jungle" (this event is dated c. 1018-19 AD).

Major medieval Ay grants

See also
 Velir
 Heo_Hwang-ok 
 Vizhinjam
 Pandya dynasty
 Chera dynasty
Cheras of Makotai

References 

History of Kerala
History of Tamil Nadu
Chera dynasty
Former kingdoms